Nightshade is a simulation and visualization software for teaching and exploring astronomy, Earth science, and related topics. Its focus is on use in digital planetarium systems or as an educational tool, with additional features to allow it to also be used on desktop or laptop computers.  It operates on Linux, macOS and Windows.

Nightshade Legacy was open source and is no longer developed. A completely new codebase, Nightshade NG (Next Generation) is licensed under the "Nightshade Public License", a non-free license with field of use restrictions but with source available.

History
Nightshade Legacy began as a fork of Stellarium by Digitalis Education Solutions after controversy between the Stellarium project and its commercial contributor about a focus on desktop versus planetarium use. Development of Nightshade Legacy ceased around 2011. 

A rewrite, Nightshade NG, was begun in 2011, with a change to a non-free license with field of use restrictions to prevent its use by commercial competitors of Digitalis.   Several Nightshade NG "preview releases" have been made.

Features of Nightshade NG
 Sky features
 The Hipparcos Catalogue with proper 3D positioning, proper motion and radial velocity
 Extra catalogues with more than 12 million stars
 Asterisms and illustrations of the constellations from many cultures
 Images of nebulae (built-in and user added)
 Realistic Milky Way
 Physically-based atmosphere allowing for realistic sunrise and sunset from anywhere on or above the Earth or Mars
 Planets of the Solar System and their major moons
 Ability to display stars and other celestial objects as seen from any reference point in the Milky Way galaxy
 Ability to fast-forward or rewind time +/- 1,000,000 years
 Terrain features
 Ability to add multiple image layers of a planet using Web Map Service or GDAL
 Ability to display imagery over topography
 Ultra-high resolution imagery for Earth, Mars, Mercury, Europa, and the Moon
 Interface
 Zoom
 Time control
 Multilingual interface
 Scripting to record and playback shows
 Fisheye projection for planetarium domes
 Graphical interface and extensive keyboard control
 Text user interface for planetarium domes
 Web-based graphical console for control from any Firefox or Mobile Safari device
 Visualization
 Equatorial, azimuthal, J2000, and galactic grids
 Star twinkling
 Shooting stars
 Eclipse simulation for any body
 Skinnable landscapes
 Spherical panorama projection
 Customisability
 Deep sky objects, landscapes, constellation images, scripts etc. can be added.
 Stratoscript command syntax to allow for easy macro-style programming
 Ability to record and playback scripts

References

External links

Planetarium software for Linux
Educational software for Windows
Educational software for macOS
Science software for macOS
Science software for Windows